Dandelion is an American company offering geothermal heating installation in the Northeast United States. Prior to 2017, the company was part of Google X, before turning into an independent company. Dandelion targets providing geothermal heating and cooling (HVAC) on a competitive basis against, to start, existing oil furnaces.  While geothermal HVAC has many advantages, penetration has been constrained over the years due to high-upfront capital costs. 

The system consists of a heat pump that pipes energy to or from a house. Dandelion made headlines in February 2019 when it raised 16 million in its series A fundraising round. As a form of renewable technology with enormous potential, geothermal energy has been called "the next solar".

Dandelion's CEO, Kathy Hannun, was named one of Fast Company's most creative people in 2018. A leader in the Green Tech industry, Hannun made headlines when she finished Dandelion's first round of fundraising the day before giving birth to her first child.

In June 2018, Dandelion began the installation of the first sub-$20,000 geothermal heat pump, Dandelion Air. The product was designed in-house by the company, which is installed in the backyard of a residential property and is currently financed over a 20-year term.

In September 2020, Dandelion announced its expansion to Connecticut.

References 

American companies established in 2017
Companies based in New York City
Geothermal energy
X (company)
Energy companies established in 2017